The California State University police departments (CSUPD) in the California State University system are referred to as CAL State Police, or University Police, the police officers are duly sworn peace officers of the State of California, as established by section 830.2(c) of the California Penal Code.  There are a total of 23 campuses in the California State University system, each with their own police department. Each csu' police department has its own chain of command, however some of the policies are system-wide.  

Unlike other police departments in the state, there is no single chief of the CSUPD, however there is a central council of chiefs (currently, Chief Fernando Solorzano of CSULB, Chief Donny Gordon of CSUM, Chief Clint Strode of CSUS). The council is responsible for ensuring that the various departments are operating within the CSUPD mission. However, the council does not dictate the day-to-day operations of the department, and each department sets its own Standard Operating Policies.

When situations arise on a campus that require more police than the individual department can handle, other CSU police departments can send mutual aid officers to help.

Authority and jurisdiction

The CSUPD is one of several police agencies in California having  statewide jurisdiction and authority (other examples include the California Highway Patrol, the University of California Police Department, and the California Department of Fish and Game). CSUPD officers, like most California police officers, are empowered by section 830.2(c) of the California Penal Code, giving them authority as duly sworn peace officers throughout the state of California. As specified by Section 89560 of the California Education Code, their primary jurisdiction extends to the campuses and properties owned by the trustees of the California State University, as well as lands within a one-mile (1.6 km) radius of those campuses.

Almost all of the campuses operate a Community Service Officer (CSO) program, which employs non-sworn students to perform tasks such as building checks and night escorts.  Most of the departments also conduct bicycle registrations, "Live Scan" fingerprinting, and lost and found.  Additionally, it is possible to have non-moving vehicle citations ("fix-it tickets") signed off at these departments.

Specialized divisions

In addition to CSO programs, CSUPD departments each have a Communications Division, which is the police dispatch center and the 9-1-1 access point for each CSU campus. Each department also staffs a Detective Division to investigate crimes and other cases reported by citizens and the patrol officers.

In addition to these standard police bureaus, several CSUPD departments also staff more specialized police and public safety units. These include: Critical Response Units (CRU), K9 Bomb Squad Units, Crime Prevention Units, Dignitary Protection Units, Mental Health Evaluation Teams (MET), Gang Intelligence Unit, Orange County Regional SWAT team and others.

In 1990, the Jeanne Clery Disclosure of Campus Security Policy and Campus Crime Statistics Act became federal law.  This law requires all universities to compile and publish data describing the reported crimes that occurred on campus.  The data for specific campuses can be found on the websites listed at the end of this article.

Stations

CSUPD, Bakersfield

The Cal State Bakersfield Police Department is located in building #60, north of the old gym.  The address is 9001 Stockdale Highway, Bakersfield, CA.

CSUPD, Cal Maritime

The Cal Maritime Academy Police Department is located at 200 Maritime Academy Drive  Vallejo, CA 94590

CSUPD, Channel Islands

The Cal State Channel Islands Police Department is located in Placer Hall, adjacent to the John Spoor Broome Library. The address of the station is 33 Camarillo Street, Camarillo, CA 93012.

The command structure consists of the Chief of Police, Police Captains, Police Lieutenants, Police Sergeants, Police Corporals, and Police Officers. Pursuant to Section 89560 of the California Education Code, and because of the various campus owned facilities throughout the County of Ventura, the primary jurisdiction of the CSUCI Police Department extends well into the city of Camarillo and Thousand Oaks.

CSU Channel Islands Police staffs patrol officers 24 hours a day, 7 days a week, 365 days a year to respond to emergencies and serve the campus community. The sworn officers patrol the campus on foot, bikes, and marked vehicles whilst performing general and specialized law enforcement duties, conducts investigations, enforces laws and traffic regulations and collisions, makes arrests, crowd control, safety hazards, administering medical aid to injured persons, fire emergencies in conjunction with other emergency service providers, conducts crime prevention and community policing program activities, and also provides information and assistance to the general public.

The communications division staffs 6 9-1-1 police dispatchers that handles 9-1-1 calls 24 hours a day, 7 days a week, 365 days a year from within the County of Ventura as well as calls from the Ventura County Community College District's campuses of Oxnard College, Ventura College, and Moorpark College.

In addition to standard patrol operations, the agency employs unsworn student community service officers. The agency also maintains various Blue Emergency Phones throughout the campus and surrounding areas as a go-to for any emergencies in the nearby vicinity.

CSUPD, Chico

The CSU Chico Police Department is located adjacent to Parking Structure 2.  The street address is 218 Normal Ave, Chico, CA.

CSUPD, Dominguez Hills

The CSU, Dominguez Hills Police Department is located in Welch Hall, room B100.  The mailing address for the department is 1000 E Victoria St, WH B100, Carson, CA.

CSUPD, East Bay

The CSU, East Bay Police Department is located at 25800 Carlos Bee Blvd, LI 1063, Hayward, CA.

CSUPD, Fresno

The CSU, Fresno Police Department was founded in 1962. In addition to law enforcement, the Fresno department administers Traffic Operations (parking enforcement & traffic control).  CSUPD-Fresno is located at 2311 East Barstow Avenue, MS/PO14, Fresno, CA. Command structure consists of The Chief of Police, two Lieutenants, six Sergeants and 18 Police Officers. In addition to standard patrol operations, the agency staffs two full-time Police Detectives.

CSUPD, Fullerton

The CSU, Fullerton Police Department is located in building UPD on the corner of State College Blvd. and Gymnasium Drive, at 800 N. State College Blvd. in Fullerton, CA. Its command structure consists of The Chief of Police, two Police Captains, and five sergeants. Pursuant to section 89560 of the California Education Code, and because of the various campus owned facilities throughout the County of Orange, the primary jurisdiction of the CSUF Police Department extends well into the cities of Fullerton, Placentia, and Irvine. CSU Fullerton Police staffs patrol officers and 9-1-1 police dispatchers 24/7, 365 days a year. In addition to standard patrol operations, the agency maintains three full-time Police Detectives in the Investigations Bureau, three officers that collaborate as a Gang Intelligence Unit to assist surrounding agencies, and several officers on the North Orange County Regional SWAT team. The communications division staffs 6 full-time, and 4 part-time police dispatchers.

In November 2012, in response to an increasing number of traffic collisions and traffic injuries on and near the campus, the department created a Traffic Enforcement Unit with the purchase of a police motorcycle and currently staffs one full-time police officer in the position of motor officer.

CSUPD, Humboldt

The CSU, Humboldt Police Department is located at #1 Harpst Street, Arcata, CA.  This is also known as the Student & Business Services Building, 1st floor, Room 101.

CSUPD, Long Beach

The CSULB Police Department is located at 1250 Bellflower Blvd. in the City of Long Beach, California. The Police Department is located in the brick building south of the Student Recreation and Wellness Center.

CSUPD, Los Angeles

The California State University Los Angeles Police Department is located at 5151 State University Drive, Los Angeles, CA.  The Police Department has 21 authorized police officer positions. Cops patrol the campus on foot, bikes, motorcycles, and marked vehicles. Officers are available 24-hours a day, seven days a week to respond to emergencies and serve the campus community. The CSULA University Police department became a nationally accredited agency in November 2001.

CSUPD, Monterey Bay

California State University, Monterey Bay is located in the City of Seaside, California. The California State University Monterey Bay Police Department conducts police services in and around the university campus.

Police Administration personnel consist of non-sworn personnel in addition to sworn police officers such as the Chief, Commander, and Patrol Sergeant or Watch Commander. Non-sworn personnel provide for administrative support, records-keeping, and property/evidence management.

CSUMB police officers are on-duty 24 hours, available at any time to respond to reports of criminal activity, suspicious circumstances, traffic collisions, safety hazards, and medical and fire emergencies in conjunction with other emergency service providers. Police officers possess the same power, authority, and training as municipal, county, and state law enforcement officers.

California State University Monterey Bay Police Department is bordered by jurisdictions from the Seaside Police Department, Marina Police Department, Monterey County Sheriff's Office, California Highway Patrol, Presidio of Monterey Police Department and United States Army Military Police.

CSUPD, Northridge

CSUPD, Pomona

This department protects the people and property of Cal Poly Pomona, the second largest land-holding university in the California State University.

CSUPD, Sacramento
6000 J Street
Sacramento CA

CSUPD, San Bernardino

CSUPD, San Diego

The SDSU Police Department is located on campus in the Public Safety Building, 55th Street and Remington Road,  San Diego, CA 92182-4390.

CSUPD, San Francisco

CSUPD, San José

Prior to the establishment of a police department at San José State University, the university employed night watchmen and security guards. The San José Police Department provided law enforcement for the campus during this time.  Beginning in the 1970s, the university began to hire sworn police officers. On October 1, 1975, the university established the police department, providing 24-hour law enforcement. In 1975, SJSU-PD was recognized by the California Commission on Police Officers Standards and Training. SJSU-PD currently has 32 sworn members, including the chief of police, 2 captains, 2 lieutenants, 8 sergeants, 6 corporals and 13 officers.  SJSU-PD has a Memorandum of Understanding with the San Jose Police Department that outlines geographical boundaries and jurisdictional duties, as well as policies on mutual aid.

The SJSU Police Department is located at One Washington Square, San Jose, CA.

CSUPD, San Luis Obispo

This department protects the people and property of California Polytechnic State University, the largest land-holding universities in the California State University. Their motto is "Protecting Our Future". The mission of the University Police Department at Cal Poly is to promote a safe and secure learning environment by maintaining order, enforcing laws, and providing professional police, emergency, parking, and access services.

The department is located in Building 36, at North Perimeter and Safety Way.

CSUPD, San Marcos

CSUPD, Sonoma

CSUPD, Stanislaus

Fallen officers

Since the establishment of the California State University Police Department, 2 officers have died in the line of duty. The following officers were from the Hayward Campus.

See also
 University of California Police Department

References

Significant events
 Operation Sudden Fall

External links
Police Department Websites
CSUPD, Bakersfield
CSUPD, Channel Islands
CSUPD, Chico
CSUPD, Dominguez Hills
CSUPD, East Bay
CSUPD, Fresno
CSUPD, Fullerton
CSUPD, Humboldt
CSUPD, Long Beach
CSUPD, Los Angeles
CSUPD, Monterey Bay
CSUPD, Northridge
CSUPD, Pomona
CSUPD, Sacramento
CSUPD, San Bernardino
CSUPD, San Diego
CSUPD, San Francisco
CSUPD, San Jose
CSUPD, San Luis Obispo
CSUPD, San Marcos
CSUPD, Sonoma
CSUPD, Stanislaus
Security Website
California Maritime Academy Public Safety

University and college police forces of the United States
California State University
School police departments of California